July is the seventh month of the year.

July may also refer to:
"July" or "JulyZerg", the pseudonym of programmer Park Sung-joon (StarCraft player)
Cassandra July, Glee character
Miranda July, American filmmaker, actress, singer, and writer
July, West Virginia, a community in the United States

Music
July (band), rock band from Ealing, U.K. from the late 1960s
July (EP), a 2006 EP released by Katatonia
July (album), a 2014 album by Marissa Nadler
"July" (Noah Cyrus song), a 2019 song by Noah Cyrus
"July" (Ocean Colour Scene song), a 2000 song by Ocean Colour Scene
"July", a 2009 song by Inna
"July", a song from The Great Cold Distance by Katatonia
"July", a 2016 song by Kris Wu
"July", a 1995 Avant-Garde Concerto by Leif Segerstam
"July", a song from Rusted Angel by Darkane
"July", a song from Birds of My Neighborhood by The Innocence Mission
"July", a song from The Power of Failing by Mineral

See also
Juli (disambiguation)